Springtime was an Austrian band of the 1970s.

The band consisted  of  Norbert Niedermayer, Walter Markel, Gerhard Markel and Erwin Broswimmer. The group represented Austria in the Eurovision Song Contest 1978, in Paris, performing the entry Mrs. Caroline Robinson. The Austrian entry finished in 15th place with 14 points.

Niedermayer had already represented his country in 1972, as part of the band Milestones.

Discography 
 Mr. Captain (1977)
 Lady on the motorbike (1977)
 Jingle me, jingle you (1977)
 Mrs. Caroline Robinson (1978)
 Lonely road (1978)

Austrian musical groups
Eurovision Song Contest entrants for Austria
Eurovision Song Contest entrants of 1978